Swing It, Professor (also known as Swing It, Buddy) is an independently produced 1937 musical comedy directed by Marshall Neilan and starring Pinky Tomlin, Paula Stone and Milburn Stone. The musical numbers were written by Connie Lee, Al Heath and Buddy LeRoux, and was produced by Conn Productions, Inc. The film capitalised on the swing dance craze.

Plot 
At Brownell University’s College of Music, Dean Wiley (George Cleveland) and two trustees are trying to revamp the music department with faster music, the Gentlemaniacs make their only appearance in the film with their rendition of Brownell's new Victory Song, which doesn't meet with the dean's approval.  The dean summons Professor Roberts (Pinky Tomlin) and he and two trustees ask him to add swing "in the spirit of the age", Roberts refuses which results in his resignation.

Unable to find a job, Roberts runs out of money and stumbles upon a group of musical hobos in the woods, complete with piano, who are singing opera. After the musical performance, the hobos are served a stew of some sort from a pot over a fire. Roberts gets in line, hoping for some food but is asked to prove he is really a musician, which he does. The next day Beaver (Ralph Peters), one of the hobos, takes Roberts under his wing and shows him how to beg for money by playing music at a spot on the street which happens to be near a swing club.

Lou Morgan (Milburn Stone) is trying to convince Teddy Ross (Paula Stone) to work at his "friend's" nightclub, which he actually owns. She agrees to think it over and puts her in a cab, dropping his wallet in the process. Roberts sees the occurrence and attempts to enter the swing club to return Morgan's wallet. After finally gaining entrance, Morgan "rewards Roberts by making him the manager of his new club, with the understanding that he pose as owner. Roberts, unaware that the club plays swing music, finally accepts.

Roberts sends for one of his students to come sing for the new nightclub, Joan Dennis (Mary Kornman), who shows up just prior to Randall (Bill Elliott), a local racketeer. Randall doesn't want Morgan moving in on his territory, but Morgan tells Randall that Roberts is the owner of the nightclub. Randall thinks "the Professor" is using an alias, and assumes he's a racketeer from Chicago, since Roberts is from Illinois. After doing some checking, Morgan and his gang discover there really is a racketeer named the Professor from Chicago.

Morgan throws a party for his gang, later Roberts and Joan leave a note for Morgan with his assistant, Toby Brickhead (Pat Gleason) saying they're going to visit Randall's nightclub. Randall tries to make "friends" with Roberts by offering him a large sum of money, Roberts is surprised and initially refuses, but after Randall offers him even more Roberts accepts.

Randall and his gang read in the newspaper that the underworld figure called the Professor is deported from Liverpool as Morgan and Joan leave to get married. Randall shows up at the nightclub in an effort to take over management. Beaver tells Roberts the only recourse they have is to get a mob and they don't have one, Roberts has another opinion on the matter. He steals a taxicab which results in a large number of taxicabs that follow Roberts to the nightclub. Roberts gets into a fistfight with Randall trying to free Teddy who has been held hostage by Randall, and Randall is knocked out just prior to the numerous taxi drivers entering the nightclub intent on finding the taxi thief. Beaver points to the still unconscious Randall and the taxi drivers say they're going to take him to jail.

Musical Numbers 
 I'm Richer Than a Millionaire – Professor
 I'm Sorta Kinda Glad – Professor
 Old Fashioned Melody –  Teddy, Professor
 What More Could I Ask For - Professor and the Singing Tramps

Cast 

 Pinky Tomlin as Professor Artemis J. Roberts
 Paula Stone as Teddy Ross
 Milburn Stone as Lou Morgan
 Mary Kornman as Joan Dennis
 Bill Elliott as Randall (as Gordon Elliott)
 Pat Gleason as Toby Brickhead
 Ralph Peters as Beaver
 George Cleveland as Dean
 Harry Depp as Trustee
 Harry Semels as Angelo
 The Gentlemaniacs 
 Paul (Mousie) Garner as Member of Gentlemaniacs
 Sam Wolfe as Member of Gentlemaniacs
 Richard Hakins as Member of Gentlemaniacs
 The Four Squires
 Lou Butterman as Member of the Four Squires
 Jack W. Smith as Member of the Four Squires
 Harry S. Powell as Member of the Four Squires
 Glen T. Moore as Member of the Four Squires
 The Four Singing Tramps
 Tom Clark as Member of Singing Tramps
 Fred Harder as Member of Singing Tramps
 Art Moore as Member of Singing Tramps
 Bob Snyder as Member of Singing Tramps
 Dan Brodie as Morgan's Assistant
 Charles Dorety as 1st Taxi Driver
 Jack Evans as Hobo on Freight Train
 George Grandee as Dance Director
 Harrison Greene as Poultry Equipment Salesman
 I. Stanford Jolley as Piano Playing Hobo

Reception 
In his book Swing Changes, David Ware Stowe incorrectly attributes the title role as the professor to Kay Kyser who does not appear in the film.

In the January 1938 edition of The Motion Picture Guide, Graham & Nash write that the film is above average and that it has an amusing story, with "songs that are pleasantly woven into the action"

References

External links
 
 
 
 
 

1937 films
1937 musical comedy films
1930s English-language films
American musical comedy films
Films directed by Marshall Neilan
American black-and-white films
1930s American films